The 1998 New York gubernatorial election was an election for the state governorship held on November 3, 1998. Incumbent Republican  governor George Pataki was re-elected with 54% of the vote. This remains the last statewide election in New York where a Republican won a majority of the vote.

Democratic primary

Candidates

 Peter Vallone Sr., Speaker of the New York City Council
 Betsy McCaughey Ross, Incumbent Lieutenant Governor
 Charles J. Hynes, Former New York City Fire Commissioner and Incumbent District Attorney for Kings County
 James LaRocca

Polling

Statewide results

General election

Polling

Results

See also
Governorship of George Pataki

References

1998
Gubernatorial
New York